Suspol, also spelled Saspol, is a village and eponymous tehsil headquarter in the Leh district of Ladakh in India. 

Saspol village is home to Saspol Caves. The interior walls of some of these caves are decorated with unique 15th century CE wall paintings.

Demographics
According to the 2011 census of India, Suspol has 198 households. The effective literacy rate (i.e. the literacy rate of population excluding children aged 6 and below) is 84.05%.

References 

Villages in Likir tehsil